The red-winged lark (Mirafra hypermetra) is a species of lark in the family Alaudidae found in eastern Africa.

Taxonomy and systematics
The red-winged lark is taken to form a species complex with the allopatric rufous-naped lark, and perhaps with the Somali lark. The name "red-winged lark" is sometimes used as an alternate name for the Indian bush lark. The alternate names red-winged bush lark and rufous-winged bush lark may also be used to describe the Indian bush lark or the Bengal bush lark respectively.

Subspecies 
Four subspecies are recognized: 
 M. h. kathangorensis - Cave, 1940: Found in south-eastern Sudan
 M. h. kidepoensis - Macdonald, 1940: Found in southern Sudan and north-eastern Uganda
 Galla red-winged lark (M. h. gallarum) – Hartert, 1907: Found in Ethiopia
 M. h. hypermetra – (Reichenow, 1879): Found in southern Somalia to north-eastern Tanzania

Description
It is a larger version of the rufous-naped lark, with a more robust bill and longer tail, but their morphological and vocal features do not intergrade where they occur together.

Distribution and habitat 
It has a patchy but quite extensive range in equatorial eastern Africa. It occurs within Ethiopia, Kenya, Somalia, South Sudan, Tanzania and Uganda, and its estimated global extent of occurrence is 660,000 km2. Its total population has yet to be quantified, but is believed to be large.

Its natural habitat is savanna in tropical to subtropical dry, open, lowland.

References

red-winged lark
Birds of East Africa
red-winged lark
Taxonomy articles created by Polbot